Vincenzo da Via Anfossi, stage name of Vincenzo De Cesare (born 1972), is an Italian rapper, born and living in Milan, Italy.

Career
Via Anfossi started his career in the latter half of the 1980s. At first, he joined the band 16K, as an accountant, with the nickname Aken. In 1998, he joined Armata 16, a band formed by former members of 16K. His first effort as a rapper/singer came on the album Spiriti Liberi, released by Armata 16 in 1999. After Armata 16 broke up, Via Anfossi became part of the Dogo Gang.

After various collaborations, both with members of the Dogo Gang and others, Via Anfossi published his first solo album as a singer: L'ora D'aria, which was distributed by Universal and produced by Don Joe and Deleterio, both members of the Dogo Gang.

In 2008–09, Via Anfossi toured with Marracash. With Marracash he was nominated for Best Italian Act at the MTV European Music Awards, alongside nominees Finley, Baustelle, Fabri Fibra, and Sonohra.

Discography

With Armata 16
1999: Spiriti Liberi

With the Dogo Gang
2004: PMC VS Club Dogo The Official Mixtape
2005: Roccia Music
2008: Benvenuti Nella Giungla

Solo
2008: L'ora D'aria

Collaborations
2003
Club Dogo ft. Vincenzo da Via Anfossi – Sangue e Filigrana
Club Dogo ft. Vincenzo da via Anfossi – Phra
2004
Tuer ft. Vincenzo da Via Anfossi – Occhi per Vedere 
2005
Don Joe & Grand Argent ft. Ask, Vincenzo da Via Anfossi & Marracash – Hustlebound
Guè Pequeno & Deleterio ft. Vincenzo da Via Anfossi & Marracash – Che Nessuno Si Muova
2006
Rischio ft. Jake La Furia, Marracash & Vincenzo da Via Anfossi – Il Giustiziere Della Notte
Thug Team ft. Marracash & Vincenzo da Via Anfossi – Grossi Calibri
Club Dogo ft. Mc Mars & Vincenzo da Via Anfossi – Don't Test
Gel & Metal Carter ft. Guè Pequeno, Vincenzo da Via Anfossi & Julia – Lavaggio del Cervello 
 2007
EnMiCasa ft. Club Dogo, Marracash & Vincenzo da Via Anfossi – La Gente Fa...
Ted Bundy ft. Marracash & Vincenzo da Via Anfossi – Che Ne Sai Della Gang
Noyz Narcos ft. Guè Pequeno & Vincenzo da Via Anfossi – Real Tv 
Space One ft. Club Dogo, Marracash & Vincenzo da Via Anfossi – Pallottole Nella Lettera
Club Dogo ft. Marracash & Vincenzo da Via Anfossi – Puro Bogotà 
Fuossera ft. Marracash & Vincenzo da Via Anfossi – Solo Andata
Montenero ft. Don Joe & Vincenzo da Via Anfossi – No So Niente 
Montenero ft. Don Joe & Vincenzo da Via Anfossi – Così e Basta
2008
Marracash ft. Vincenzo da Via Anfossi & Jake La Furia – Quello Che Deve Arrivare – Arriva Arriva 
Sgarra ft. Jake La Furia & Vincenzo da Via Anfossi – Sub Zero
Sgarra ft. Vincenzo da Via Anfossi – Libero Arbitrio

References

External links
MySpace official

1972 births
Italian rappers
Living people
People of Calabrian descent
Musicians from Milan